Region XXIII of the National Junior College Athletic Association consists of two conferences, the Louisiana Community Colleges Athletic Conference (LCCAC) and Mississippi Association of Community & Junior Colleges (MACCC).

LCCAC Members
Baton Rouge Community College 
Delgado Community College 
Louisiana State University at Eunice 
Nunez Community College
Southern University at Shreveport

MACCC Members
Coahoma Community College
Copiah-Lincoln Community College
East Central Community College
East Mississippi Community College
Hinds Community College
Holmes Community College
Itawamba Community College
Jones County Junior College
Meridian Community College
Mississippi Delta Community College
Mississippi Gulf Coast Community College
Northeast Mississippi Community College
Northwest Mississippi Community College
Pearl River Community College
Southwest Mississippi Community College

See also
National Junior College Athletic Association (NJCAA)

External links
MACCC official website
NJCAA Website

National Junior College Athletic Association